Guglielmo Brezzi (24 December 1898 – 7 April 1926) was an Italian professional footballer who played as a forward.

Career
At club level, Brezzi played for Genoa C.F.C. and U.S. Alessandria Calcio 1912. Brezzi made his debut for the Italy national football team on 18 January 1920 in a game against France and scored a hat-trick in a 9–4 victory. He represented Italy at the 1920 Summer Olympics.

References

External links
 

1898 births
1926 deaths
Italian footballers
Italy international footballers
Genoa C.F.C. players
U.S. Alessandria Calcio 1912 players
Olympic footballers of Italy
Footballers at the 1920 Summer Olympics
Association football forwards